Bronson is an Australian-American electronic dance music trio, composed of record producer Golden Features (Thomas George Stell) and the duo Odesza (Harrison Mills and Clayton Knight). The project formed in early 2019. They are signed to Warner Music Australasia, Ninja Tune and Odesza's own label Foreign Family Collective.

History
The work for Bronson started once Stell had finished up work on his debut album Sect. The trio of producers had previously bonded on the 2016 Groovin the Moo festival circuit, but they made concrete plans to work together after Odesza played St Jerome's Laneway Festival in 2018. After the festival, they rented a house in Berry, New South Wales, with no aim in mind.

Discography

Studio albums

Singles

Notes

References

Australian musicians
Electronic music groups
House music groups
Australian electronic music groups
American electronic music groups